The Central Fire was a wildfire that burned in Tonto National Forest in Maricopa County, Arizona in the United States. It was contained on June 30, 2020 and was human caused.

Events

The Central Fire was first reported on June 20, 2020, around 11 AM, burning on the border of the Tonto National Forest and Bureau of Land Management land east of New River, Arizona. Select National Forest lands and roads were closed. The evening of June 22, it was announced that the fire was human caused. 

Due to the fire burning in a rugged area, crews were transported in via helicopter and utility vehicles. As of June 26, the fire was 80 percent contained and Burned Area Emergency Response assessments had started. On June 30, the fire was 100% contained.

Impact

The Central Fire, which burned during the same time as the Bush Fire, impacted air quality in the northern and eastern parts of Phoenix, Arizona.

References

Wildfires in Arizona
Wildfires in Maricopa County, Arizona
2020 Arizona wildfires